Metro Chinese Network is a Rockville, Maryland-based Chinese-language TV station.  It occupied DTV channel 30.3 in Greater Washington, DC area. Their content comes from Chinese Mainland, Taiwan, Hong Kong, including concerts, dancing, and contemporary TV series.  It broadcast 20/7.  As of October 1, 2011, the free OTA network had stopped broadcasting due to budget difficulties.

Television networks in the United States
Asian-American culture in Maryland
Chinese-language television
Companies based in Rockville, Maryland
Hong Kong-American culture
Taiwanese-American culture